The Lho La() is a col on the border between Nepal and Tibet north of the Western Cwm, near Mount Everest.

History and name

Historically, the col was used as a pass over the lowest point of Everest's West Ridge for traders between Nepal and Tibet on the route between Namche Bazaar and Tingri at a time when Everest's glaciers were much higher than at present and traversing the col involved less steep climbing. However, as the glaciers declined the favoured trade route became the Nangpa La, to the west.

Following the 1952 Swiss Mount Everest expedition it was suggested that "Lho La" (South Pass) was an unsatisfactory name because it lies to the west of Everest and it would better be renamed "Khumbu La" because it led up from the Khumbu Glacier. This would allow the South Col to be called "Lho La" as it is the col south of Everest and between it and Lhotse. Unfortunately the Nangpa La had been called the Khumbu La in the past and was still sometimes being called by that name. British sentiment was against the proposed name changes and the new names never stuck.

Approach from Tibet

The first western explorers to discover the col were George Mallory and Guy Bullock on the 1921 British Mount Everest reconnaissance expedition although it was only Bullock who actually reached it. They were exploring the West Rongbuk Glacier in Tibet hoping it might give access to a route for reaching the summit of Everest. They named it "Lho La", meaning "South Pass" simply because it was to the south of where they were. This rather self-centred decision was to give difficulties later, as mentioned above. Lho La gave access to Everest's West Ridge and to its Western Cwm but they thought neither of these gave feasible ways of ascent.

Lho La was also investigated by Bill Tilman and Edmund Wigram on the 1935 British Mount Everest reconnaissance expedition but, like the 1921 explorers, they also preferred the North Col route for a summit attempt.

Approach from Nepal

By 1951 China's occupation of Tibet and the opening of Nepal to foreigners meant that Everest was only accessible from the south. A Dane, Klavs Becker-Larsen travelled to Khumbu with the intention of entering Tibet secretly and attempting the North Col route. His attempts to cross the frontier by climbing the Lho La were unsuccessful and he had to retreat.

A British reconnaissance in 1951 assessed the route through the Khumbu Icefall to the Western Cwm, hence by-passing Lho La, and in subsequent years this was the line that was followed, so leading to the South Col and the Southeast Ridge. The successful ascent of Everest in 1963 by Americans Tom Hornbein and Willi Unsoeld via the West Ridge and the Hornbein Couloir was achieved by climbing from the Western Cwm to the West Shoulder, well east of the Lho La.

After unsuccessful attempts in 1974 and 1978, the first time Everest was climbed via the Lho La was in 1979 when a Yugoslavian team ascended the West Ridge from there (without diverting onto the Hornbein Couloir). They assessed the climbing grade as between II and III, and on the upper  as between IV and V, claiming this to be the highest grade V climb in the world. In 1989 five out of six climbers in a Polish team, attempting a descent that involved climbing Khumbutse from the West Rongbuk Glacier via Lho La, were swept to their deaths on the Lho La itself as they climbed above the col, with one survivor Andrzej Marciniak.

References

Citations

Sources

External links

 – video showing the change in height of the West Rongbuk Glacier, in the area of Lho La, between the years 1921 and 2008.

Mount Everest
Mountain passes of the Himalayas
Mountain passes of Nepal
Mountain passes of Tibet
Mountain passes of China